Paducah Independent School District is a public school district based in Paducah, Texas (USA).

The district has one school Paducah High School that serves students in grades kindergarten through twelve.

In 2009, the school district was rated "academically acceptable" by the Texas Education Agency.

References

External links
 Paducah ISD -- Home of the Dragons!
 Cottle County government's website
Cottle County in Handbook of Texas Online at the University of Texas
 Cottle, George Washington (1811-1836)
 Historical Marker
 Historical Marker

School districts in Cottle County, Texas